Bounkong Syhavong is a Laotian politician and the current Minister for Health.

References

Living people
Lao People's Revolutionary Party politicians
Year of birth missing (living people)
Place of birth missing (living people)
Health ministers of Laos
21st-century Laotian politicians